William Stone (born March 12, 1944, Goldsboro, North Carolina) is an American operatic baritone.  He is a graduate of Duke University (B.A., 1966) and University of Illinois at Urbana-Champaign (M.M. 1968, D.M.A. 1979).  He made his professional operatic debut in 1975 and his international debut in 1977.

He was inducted as a National Patron of Delta Omicron, an international professional music fraternity on April 1, 2003.

William Stone is a Vocal Instructor at the Academy of Vocal Arts in Philadelphia, Pennsylvania and the Curtis Institute of Music.  He was Professor of Voice and Opera at the Boyer College of Music and Dance, Temple University, from September, 2005 through June, 2010.

Debuts
Lyric Opera of Chicago, world premiere of Paradise Lost, (Adam), 29 November 1978.
New York City Opera, La traviata (Giorgio Germont), October 1981.
Seattle Opera, Don Carlos (Rodrigue), July 1993.
Metropolitan Opera, Roméo et Juliette (Capulet), 8 April 1998.

Recordings
Mozart: Mass in C minor - Edith Wiens (soprano), Delores Ziegler (mezzo-soprano), John Aler (tenor), William Stone (baritone), Atlanta Symphony Orchestra and Chorus, Robert Shaw (conductor). Label: Telarc.
Schubert: Mass no 2 in G major, D 167 - Dawn Upshaw (soprano), David Gordan (tenor), William Stone (baritone), Atlanta Symphony Orchestra and Chorus, Robert Shaw (conductor). Label: Telarc.
Walton: Belshaazar's Feast - William Stone (baritone), Atlanta Symphony Orchestra and Chorus, Robert Shaw (conductor). Label: Telarc.

Notes and references

Bargreen, Melinda, "Verdi's 'Don Carlos' Is Lengthy But Luscious", The Seattle Times, 25 July 1993. Retrieved on 26 December 2008.
Henahan, Donal, "City Opera: 'Taviata' with Diana Soviero", New York Times, 18 October 1981. Retrieved on 26 December 2008.
Metropolitan Opera Archives, "Stone, William (Baritone)", MetOpera Database. Retrieved on 26 December 2008.
Ross, Alex, "Comfortable Shoes and Other Tricks of a Baritone", New York Times, 29 September 1992. Retrieved on 26 December 2008.
Swan, Annalyn, "Heavenly Bore", Time Magazine, 11 December 1978. Retrieved on 26 December 2008.

External links
William Stone official website
Short Biography (Academy of Vocal Arts)
Short biography (Bach-Cantatas.com)

American operatic baritones
1944 births
Living people
People from Goldsboro, North Carolina
University of Illinois at Urbana–Champaign School of Music alumni
University of Illinois alumni
Duke University alumni
20th-century American male opera singers
Temple University faculty
Academy of Vocal Arts faculty
Singers from North Carolina
Classical musicians from North Carolina